The Liao dynasty (Khitan: Mos Jælud), also known as the Khitan Empire (Khitan: Mos diau-d kitai huldʒi gur), officially the Great Liao, was an imperial dynasty of China that existed between 916 and 1125, ruled by the Yelü clan of the Khitan people. Founded around the time of the collapse of the Tang dynasty, at its greatest extent it ruled over Northeast China, the Mongolian Plateau, the northern part of the Korean Peninsula, southern portions of the Russian Far East, and the northern tip of the North China Plain.

The dynasty had a history of territorial expansion. The most important early gains was the Sixteen Prefectures (including present-day Beijing and part of Hebei) by fueling a proxy war that led to the collapse of the Later Tang dynasty (923–936). In 1004, the Liao dynasty launched an imperial expedition against the Northern Song dynasty. After heavy fighting and large casualties between the two empires, both sides worked out the Chanyuan Treaty. Through the treaty, the Liao dynasty forced the Northern Song to recognize them as peers and heralded an era of peace and stability between the two powers that lasted approximately 120 years. It was the first state to control all of Manchuria.

Tension between traditional Khitan social and political practices and Han influence and customs was a defining feature of the dynasty. This tension led to a series of succession crises; Liao emperors favored the Han concept of primogeniture, while much of the rest of the Khitan elite supported the traditional method of succession by the strongest candidate. In addition, the adoption of Han system and the push to reform Khitan practices led Abaoji to set up two parallel governments. The Northern Administration governed Khitan areas following traditional Khitan practices, while the Southern Administration governed areas with large non-Khitan populations, adopting traditional Han governmental practices.

The Liao dynasty was destroyed by the Jurchen-led Jin dynasty in 1125 with the capture of the Emperor Tianzuo of Liao. However, the remnant Liao loyalists, led by Yelü Dashi (Emperor Dezong of Liao), established the Western Liao dynasty (Qara Khitai), which ruled over parts of Central Asia for almost a century before being conquered by the Mongol Empire. Although cultural achievements associated with the Liao dynasty are considerable, and a number of various statuary and other artifacts exist in museums and other collections, major questions remain over the exact nature and extent of the influence of the Liao culture upon subsequent developments, such as the musical and theatrical arts.

Names 
The "Great Khitan State" was founded in 907 by Abaoji (Emperor Taizu of Liao). In 947, Abaoji's successor, Emperor Taizong of Liao, officially renamed the dynasty as "Great Liao". This was probably due to the inclusion of non-Khitan peoples in the state. The name was changed back to "Great Khitan" in 983 during the reign of the Emperor Shengzong of Liao due to a reassertion of Khitan identity. In 1066, Emperor Daozong of Liao reintroduced the dynastic name "Great Liao" and the title remained in official use until the dynasty's collapse. Both "Great Khitan" and "Great Liao" enjoyed about 100 years of usage each.

In 1124, the successor state established by Yelü Dashi in the Western Regions also officially adopted the dynastic name "Great Liao". In historiography, however, this regime is more commonly called the "Western Liao" or "Qara Khitai". Due to the dominance of the Khitans during the Liao dynasty in Northeast China and Mongolia and later the Qara Khitai in Central Asia where they were seen as Chinese, the term "Khitai" came to mean "China" to people near them in Central Asia, Russia and northwestern China. The name was then introduced to medieval Europe via Islamic and Russian sources, and became "Cathay". In the modern era, words related to Khitay are still used as a name for China by Turkic peoples, such as the Uyghurs in China's Xinjiang region and the Kazakhs of Kazakhstan and areas adjoining it, and by some Slavic peoples, such as the Russians and Bulgarians.

There is no consensus among historians regarding the etymology of "Liao". Some believe that "Liao" was derived from the word for "iron" in the Khitan language, while others believe that the name came from the Liao River catchment which was the traditional homeland of the Khitan people.

History

Pre-dynastic history

Origins
The earliest reference to a Khitan state is found in the Book of Wei, a history of the Northern Wei dynasty (386–534) that was completed in 554. Several books written after 554 mention the Khitans being active during the late third and early fourth centuries. The Book of Jin (648), a history of the Jin dynasty (266–420), refers to the Khitans in the section covering the reign of Murong Sheng (398–401). Samguk Sagi (1145), a history of the Three Kingdoms of Korea, mentions a Khitan raid taking place in 378.

According to sinologists Denis C. Twitchett and Klaus-Peter Tietze, it is generally held that the Khitans emerged from the Yuwen branch of the Xianbei people. Following a defeat at the hands of another branch of the Xianbei in 345, the Yuwen split into three tribes, one of which was called the Kumo Xi. In 388 the Kumo Xi itself split, with one group remaining under the name Kumo Xi and the other group becoming the Khitans. This view is partially backed up by the Book of Wei, which describes the Khitans being of Xianbei origins. Beginning in the Song dynasty, some Chinese scholars suggested that the Khitans might have descended from the Xiongnu people. While modern historians have rejected the idea that the Khitan were solely Xiongnu in origin, there is some support for the claim that they are of mixed Xianbei and Xiongnu origin. Beginning with Rashid-al-Din Hamadani in the fourteenth century, several scholars have theorized that the Khitans were Mongolic in origin, and in the late 19th century, Western scholars made the claim that the Khitans were Tungusic in origin—modern linguistic analysis has discredited this claim.

After splitting from the Yuwen, the Khitans and Kumo Xi fled to the region of Songmo (modern southern Hexigten Banner and western Ongniud Banner). According to the New Book of Tang, the territory of the Khitans rested on what is now the area south of Xar Moron River and east of the Laoha. The Khitans then faced a joint invasion by the Rouran Khaganate and Goguryeo, which caused them to migrate south to the east of Bailang River (modern Daling River).

By the time the Book of Wei was written in 554, the Khitans had formed a state in what is now China's Jilin and Liaoning Provinces. The Khitans suffered a series of military defeats to other nomadic groups in the region, as well as to the Chinese Northern Qi (550–577) and Sui (589–618) dynasties. Khitan tribes at various times fell under the influence of Turkic tribes such as the Uighurs and Chinese dynasties such as the Sui and Tang. In the Book of Sui (Volume 84), the Khitan are described as "bellicose in plundering and raiding borders" and "the most uncourteous and arrogant among all barbarians".

Eight tribes
There were eight Khitan tribes: the Xiwandan, Hedahe (Adahe), Fufuyu (Jufufu), Yuling (Yuyuling), Rilian, Piqie (Pilier), Li (black), and Tuliuhan (Tuliuyu). The eight tribes shared power by rotating leadership triennially. The Khitan federation presented tribute to the Northern Yan (409–436), which in return invested the Khitan khan as Prince Guishan. The Khitans also regularly presented tribute to the Northern Wei (386–534) court in the form of horses and animal skins. Trade occurred on the border in Helong (modern Chaoyang) and Miyun. In 553, the Khitans suffered a defeat to the armies of Northern Qi (550–577) and lost a large portion of their population as well as cattle. For a time they resided in Goguryeo. In 584, they submitted to the Sui dynasty (581–618). In 605, they were attacked by the Türks and lost 40,000 men and women. The eight tribes of old dispersed. Only two Khitan leaders are known from this period: Hechen and Wuyu. The title of Khitan chieftains was Mofuhe or Mohefu.

Dahe Confederation

Sometime during the Sui dynasty, the military organization of the Khitans became more advanced. According to the Book of Sui, "In the case of a military operation, the chieftains discussed it together. In mobilizing troops, tallies needed to be matched". In the early 7th century, the Dahe clan unified the Khitan tribes in a federation that was able to raise 34,000 troops. The tribal composition of the Dahe Confederation is listed as Daji, Hebian, Duhuo, Fenwen, Tubian, Ruixi, Zhuijin, and Fu. The Hedahe were the leading tribe of the Confederation, from which its name is taken from. Other tribes mentioned are: Danjieli, Yishihuo, Shihuo, Nawei, Pinmo, Nahuiji, Jijie, and Xiwa. The component tribes were largely autonomous and the Dahe were only responsible for foreign affairs. After the Dahe united the Khitans, the system of rotating leadership was replaced by "Shixuan", electing a leader based on their talent and ability from the Dahe lineage. The other clans had the right to vote but not to be elected. Brothers, cousins, and nephews often succeeded rather than the son of the previous leader. No internal conflicts among the Khitan tribes are recorded after the unification of the Dahe.

In 628, the Dahe Confederation led by Mohui submitted to the Tang. In 648, they submitted to the Tang again under the leadership of Kuge. Kuge was appointed the Governor-general of Songmo and several prefectures were set up for Khitan tribes: Qiaoluo for the Daji, Tanhan for the Hebian, Wufeng for the Duhuo, Yuling for the Fenwen, Rilian for the Tubian, Tuhe for the Ruixi, Wandan for the Zhuijin, Pili for the Fu. The chieftains of the tribes were appointed as prefects. The Tang emperor bestowed the Chinese surname Li on the Dahe and appointed their leader to a governorship that was "an office specifically created for the indirect management of the Khitan tribes". Some Khitan tribes such as the Songmo, Xuanzhou, Neiji, Yishige, and Yishihuo were not included in the Dahe Confederation. The Neiji tribe led by Sun Aocao submitted to the Tang in 619. Aocao's great-grandson Sun Wanrong was appointed prefect of Guicheng.

Towards the turn of the century, however, Tang control of the north began to slip. The Governor-general of Yingzhou, Zhao Wenhui, regarded the Khitan chieftains as his servants. The Khitan chieftain Sun Wanrong and his brother-in-law, the governor of Songmo, Li Jinzhong, felt insulted and bullied by Zhao. In 696, a famine occurred in Khitan territory and Zhao failed to provide relief, sparking a rebellion. The Dahe leader, Li Jinzhong, captured Yingzhou and declared himself "Wushang Khagan" (paramount khagan). The Tang sent 28 generals against the Khitans but were defeated at Xiashi Gorge (Lulong County). The Tang troops continued to suffer defeat until Li Jinzhong died of disease. Qapaghan Qaghan of the Second Turkic Khaganate offered to aid the Tang in return for subdued Türkic households under Tang control. The Türks attacked the Khitans from the north while the Tang invaded from the south. The Khitans suffered a heavy defeat before Sun Wanrong rescued the situation and counterattacked, seizing Yingzhou and Youzhou. A 170,000 strong Tang army was sent against the Khitans and defeated. Another 200,000 soldiers were sent against the Khitans but failed to stop their advance. However the Khitans failed to account for the Türks sacking their capital, Xincheng, and the defection of the Kumo Xi from their ranks. Sun Wanrong was killed by his servant. Although the rebellion was defeated, it took over fifteen years from 700 to 714 before the Tang were able to reassert control over the Khitans.

In 720 the military chief (Yaguan) Ketuyu attacked the reigning Khitan ruler, Suogu. Suogu fled to Yingzhou seeking Chinese protection. General Xue Tai was ordered to punish Ketuyu but he failed and was captured along with Suogu and the Kumo Xi king Li Dapu. Ketuyu enthroned Suogu's cousin Yuyu as the new Khitan ruler. Ketuyu sent tribute to the Tang court but the official in charge treated him with rudeness. Ketuyu murdered the Khitan ruler Shaogu and defected to the Türks. Ketuyu suffered a defeat against the Tang in 732 and fled while his Kumo Xi allies surrendered to the Tang. In 734, Ketuyu defeated a Tang army with the support of his Türkic allies and then lost another battle against Tang forces under the command of Zhang Shougui. The Tang convinced a Khitan military official, Li Guozhe, to murder Ketuyu and the Khitan ruler Qulie, who had been enthroned by Ketuyu.

Yaonian Confederation

The rebellion of Ketuyu ended Dahe supremacy in 730. Li Guozhe, chief of the Yishihuo tribe, and Nieli, also from the Yishihuo tribe, founded a new confederation. Nieli enthroned Zuwu Khagan from the Yaonian clan as the supreme ruler of the Khitans, while Nieli became the military chief. Although there was a khagan, the military chief's power actually exceeded that of the khagan throughout the duration of the confederation. The ten tribes of the Yaonian Confederation consisted of the Danlijie, Yishihuo, Shihuo, Nawei, Pinmo, Nahuiji, Jijie, Xiwa, Yaonian, and Yila. Other tribes are also mentioned: the Yishi, Pin, Chute, Wukui, Niela, Tulübu, and Tuju.

The Tang governor An Lushan launched two invasions into Khitan territory in 751 and 755. After being soundly defeated by the Khitans during the first invasion, An Lushan was successful in the second. An then led a rebellion against the Tang that included Khitan troops in his army. An had a Khitan eunuch named Li Zhuer who worked for him as a teenager but An Lushan used a sword to sever his genitals and he almost died after losing multiple pints of blood. An revived him by smearing ashes on his injury. Li Zhuer was highly trushed by An Lushan, and he and two other men served as his personal attendants. Li Zhuer was approached by conspirators who wanted to kill An when he became ill and started abusing his subordinates. An was hacked to death by Li Zhuer and another conspirator, Yan Zhuang, who was beaten by An before. An screamed "this is a thief of my own household" as he desperately shook his curtains since he could not find his sword to defend himself. The An Lushan Rebellion marked the beginning of the end of the Tang dynasty.

Rise to power
Following the An Lushan Rebellion, the Khitans became vassals of the Uighurs, while simultaneously paying tributes to the Tang, a situation that lasted from 755 until the fall of the Uighurs in 840. There were 29 recorded tribute activities to the Tang from 756 to 841. From 840 until the rise of Abaoji, the Khitans remained a tributary of the Tang dynasty. Towards the end of that period, the Khitans began a series of major conquests. Under the reign of Xianzhi Khagan (860?–882?), the Khitans subjugated the Kumo Xi and Shiwei. Two campaigns were launched against the Kumo Xi. Xianzhi captured 700 Xi households who were later settled as the Dieladieda tribe under Abaoji's reign. Saladi, Abaoji's father, captured 7,000 Xi households and moved them to Qinghe in the region of Raole (west of modern Ningcheng County). During the Xiantong reign period (860–874), Xianzhi sent envoys to the Tang court twice.

Abaoji (907–926)

Abaoji, posthumously Emperor Taizu of Liao, was born in 872 to the Yila chieftain, Saladi. By the time of Abaoji, the Yila had become the largest and strongest of the Khitan tribes, even though the Yaonian khans still held overall power. The Yila tribe was descended from the Yishihuo, who settled closer to Han civilization than other Khitans. In the 730s, the Yila became a tribe independent of the Yaonian. Under the influence of Han culture, Yundeshi (820s–860s?), Abaoji's grandfather, became the first Khitan to practice and teach settled agriculture. Shulan, Abaoji's uncle, was the first Khitan to practice masonry and build walled cities. To their south, the Han people of Youzhou Jiedushi fled the rule of Liu Rengong, most of them ending up in Yila territory. Han farmers were resettled by Abaoji and Han craftsman taught the Khitans how to spin and weave. The adoption of agrarian culture, Han refugees, and more advanced labor organization made the Yila tribe far richer than other Khitans. Abaoji placed Han intellectuals such as Kang Moji, Han Yanhui, and Han Zhigu into his administration. Kang Moji was responsible for legal matters between Khitans and Han. Later he supervised the building of the capital city. Han Yanhui was made an official in charge of military affairs and oversaw the subdued Han population, settling them and making sure they did not flee. Han Zhigu participated in strategy and decision making. He later took charge of the department handling Han affairs and managed protocols of foreign affairs. He also combined Han institutions and Khitan customs to make them easier to understand for Khitans.

Abaoji held the title of Dama Yueshali, the commander of the khagan's personal guard, in the late 9th century. In 901, Abaoji was elected Yilijin (chieftain) of the Yila by the triennial council. None of the Khitans except the Yaonian used surnames at the time, but later in the 930s, Abaoji's clan adopted Yelü as their surname. At the same time their consort clan also began using the surname Xiao.

After his accession as leader of the Yila, Abaoji raided the Tang dynasty, attacked the Jurchens, and established superiority over the Shiwei and Kumo Xi. In 903, Abaoji was named Yüyue, the supreme commander of all Khitans, second only to the Yaonian Khagan. Two years later, he led 70,000 cavalry to Datong to form a blood oath with the Shatuo warlord Li Keyong. Abaoji and Li Keyong had a conversation about the Khitan way of succession. Abaoji was concerned that he would be replaced in three years and Keyong noted that there was also a practice of replacement for his post. He told Abaoji that he could just refuse to be replaced.

In 907, Abaoji demanded that he be made Khagan, and ascended as supreme leader of the Khitans with support from seven other tribes. Abaoji then slaughtered the other Khitan chieftains, alarming the Khitan elite, many of whom saw his action as a move towards Han-style emperorship. Abaoji's rule went unchallenged until 910, when he disregarded Khitan calls for another member of the family to assume the position of Khagan. In 912 and 913, members of Abaoji's family attempted armed insurrections. After the first insurrection was discovered and defeated, Abaoji pardoned the conspirators. After the second, only his brothers were pardoned, with the other conspirators suffering violent deaths. The brothers plotted rebellions in 917 and 918, both of which were easily crushed.

In 916, Abaoji assumed the title of Celestial Emperor, proclaimed a Chinese era name, and built a Confucian temple. He named his eldest son, Yelü Bei, from his primary consort, Shulü Ping, as heir apparent and demanded the entire nobility to swear fealty to him. Two years later, the Liao court was moved to the "Supreme Capital" (Shangjing), a newly built walled city with a grand park and imperial tents where the Chinese palaces would normally be located. Abaoji fostered the construction of 30 more walled cities for his captured ethnic Han subjects to inhabit. The Supreme Capital was joined by the "Eastern Capital" (Dongjing). Administration of the empire was divided between a Northern Administration overseeing steppe and tribal affairs and a Southern Establishment overseeing the settled and Han population. The two institutions were headed by chancellors, the northern one appointed by the Xiao consort clan, and the southern one appointed by the ruling Yelü clan.

In 917, Abaoji received naphtha as a gift from the state of Wuyue:

In 920, Abaoji ordered the development of a Khitan writing system known as the Khitan large script. While superficially similar to Chinese writing, it arbitrarily adds and reduces strokes to Chinese characters to compose words, making it completely unrecognizable to Han readers. In 925, the arrival of a Uyghur delegation led Abaoji to order his younger brother, Yelü Diela, to study the Old Uyghur language. Uyghur influence led to the development of a Khitan small script with more phonetic elements. The Khitan script was used for memorial inscriptions on wood and stone and record keeping in the Northern Administration. Almost no extensive documents written in Khitan script have survived, suggesting that few were ever produced. In the Southern Establishment, Chinese was the administrative language, which many Khitans learned, including Abaoji's sons. In a conversation with Yao Kun, an envoy from Later Tang, Abaoji said he spoke Chinese but did not speak it in the presence of other Khitans, because he feared that they would emulate the Han and grow soft.

During his reign, Abaoji attacked numerous neighboring peoples and expanded Liao territory exponentially. Against the steppe nomads, he led campaigns in 908 against the Shiwei, in 910 the Kumo Xi, in 912 the Zubu, in 915 the Khongirad, and again in 919 to subdue the Khongirad. From 922 to 923, he raided the Jin and its successor, Later Tang. A year later he attacked the Tatars. His campaigns continued right up until his death in 926 with the conquest of Balhae and the creation of the puppet Kingdom of Dongdan. Most of Balhae's population was relocated to what is now Liaoning. The destruction of Balhae resulted in three independent groups beyond Khitan control: the northwestern Balhae people in modern Heilongjiang, the Balhae people west of the Yalu River, and the state of Jeongan in the upper valley of the Mudan River.

Abaoji died of typhoid fever at the age of 54 on 6 September 926.

Taizong (926–947)

Yelü Deguang, posthumously Emperor Taizong of Liao, was the second son of Shulü Ping and not the first in line for the Khitan throne. His elder brother, the 26-year old heir apparent Yelü Bei, was disliked by the conservative Khitan elites for his intellectual pursuits. As a polymath, Yelü Bei was skilled in painting, writing in both Khitan and Chinese languages, and possessed a large personal library. He also had a taste for Chinese culture, music, medicine, and prognostication. Chinese-style primogeniture was also not a custom among the Khitans, who had elected their leader since the time of the Dahe Confederation, which was why Abaoji had them swear allegiance to Yelü Bei when he announced him as heir apparent. Bei's mother, Shulü Ping, who was exceptionally powerful in her own right, commanding thousands of horsemen and leading troops on campaign, took control of all military and civil affairs as regent, after having cut off her right hand to be buried with her husband. Shulü Ping herself disproved of her first son as heir due to his Chinese leanings and used all her influence to have Bei set aside for his younger brother, Deguang, who had participated in the 922–923 and 924–925 campaigns. Toward the end of 927, Bei approached his mother and formally withdrew his claim. Deguang succeeded the throne.

Bei was still ruler of the Dongdan Kingdom in former Balhae, given to him by his father after participating in its conquest. Taizong, who still regarded him as a threat, ordered in 929 that the capital of Dongdan and all its inhabitants be moved to the Eastern Capital (Dongjing). Dongdan lost its semi-autonomous status. In 930, Bei fled by sea to the Later Tang court and was received by Li Siyuan as an honored guest. In 937, he was killed by Shi Jingtang, who overthrew Later Tang and ruled Later Jin (Five Dynasties) as a puppet of the Khitans.

In 929, the Khongirad rebelled. In the same year, Taizong sent his younger brother, Yelü Lihu, to attack the Later Tang at Datong. In 933, Taizong led a campaign against some Tangut tribes. The most important expansion of Khitan territory during this period, however, came from political instability in the south. In 933, the Later Tang emperor died. His son, Li Conghou, lasted only five months before his adoptive brother, Li Congke, killed him. Li Congke ordered a powerful governor, Shi Jingtang, to be transferred for closer supervision by the court, leading to his rebellion. Hard pressed by Li Congke, Shi Jingtang sought aid from the Khitans. Taizong led a 50,000 strong cavalry force to his aid and defeated the Later Tang army near Taiyuan. On 28 November 936, Shi Jingtang was invested as emperor of Later Jin by the Khitans. In 938, the puppet emperor of Later Jin transferred the Sixteen Prefectures over to the Khitans, granting them access to the strategic fortifications of northern China and the Central Plains. A new "Southern Capital" (Nanjing) was constructed at modern Beijing. Shi Jingtang behaved as a vassal and even allowed Khitan envoys to cross his territory to contact Southern Tang, his geopolitical rival.

Shi Jingtang died in 942. His nephew and successor, Shi Chonggui, came under the influence of an anti-Khitan court led by the army commander Jing Yanguang. In 943, Shi Chonggui revoked the trading privileges of the Khitans in Kaifeng and confiscated their property, sending their representative back to the Khitan court. Taizong invaded in the following year but suffered a defeat in 945, having to escape the battle on a camel. However, with persistence, the Khitans wore down the Jin forces, and in 946, the Jin commander in chief, Du Chongwei, surrendered. In early 947, Taizong entered Kaifeng unopposed. The Jin emperor and his family were exiled to the Supreme Capital. The Jin army was disarmed and disbanded, their horses confiscated. With this great victory, Taizong formally adopted a dynastic name, the "Great Liao". With the conquest of Later Jin, the Liao acquired the Jade Seal of State Transmission (chuanguo yuxi). Ideologically, the Liao therefore regarded itself as the legitimate successor of the Later Jin, and the ruler of China. It hence chose the Water element, the element that follows the Metal element, the dynastic element of the Later Jin, according to the sequence of creation of the Five Elements (wuxing). It also chose the Water element's corresponding color black as its dynastic color.

His victory did not last. Having brought inadequate supplies, the Khitans wantonly looted the city and plundered the countryside provisions, and imposed harsh levies on the local populace, causing them to become resentful and attack them. Rather than stay and govern the conquered city, the Khitans decided to ship everything of value, from Jin officials and palace women to maps and music instruments, back to the Supreme Capital. Taizong also faced another threat from Taiyuan, where Liu Zhiyuan announced a new Later Han (Five Dynasties) dynasty. The occupation of Kaifeng lasted three months before Taizong withdrew. Shortly before reaching Liao territory, Taizong suddenly fell ill and died near modern-day Shijiazhuang at the age of 45 on 18 May 947.

Shizong (947–951)

Yelü Ruan, posthumously Emperor Shizong of Liao, was the son of Yelü Bei, and not the designated heir of Emperor Taizong of Liao, who was Yelü Lihu, Taizong's younger brother. However Taizong had raised Ruan after Bei's departure in 930 and the relationship between them was as close as father and son. Ruan participated in the invasion of Later Jin, earning himself as a capable warrior and commander. Upon Taizong's death, Ruan declared himself emperor before "his father's coffin".

Lihu attacked Ruan while he was on his way back to the Supreme Capital but was defeated. His mother, Shulü Ping, then led her own army to confront Ruan. The two armies faced each other on the Xar Moron River, south of the Supreme Capital, for several days. The deadlock was resolved by a royal cousin named Yelü Wuzhi and ultimately Lihu, who the Khitan nobility viewed as cruel and spoiled, was unable to gain enough support to further challenge Shizong. After a peace was brokered, Ruan formally assumed the role of emperor and the title of emperor. Shizong promptly exiled both Empress Shulü Ping and Yelü Lihu from the capital, ending their political ambitions. Shizong hoped this would secure his position but he quickly became disillusioned as the internal situation of the Liao remained unstable. In 948, the second son of Taizong, Yelü Tiande, conspired to murder the emperor. The conspiracy failed and the conspirators' lives were spared. Among them, Xiao Han, a nephew of Shulü Ping, conspired against Shizong again in the following year. Despite being spared again, Xiao Han returned to his old ways a third time, resulting in his execution.

In 947, a planned invasion of Goryeo was aborted when the Khitans realized that enemy defenses were more formidable than they had thought.

From 949 to 950, Shizong invaded Later Han. In late 951, Shizong decided to invade Later Zhou. Before the army set off, Shizong and his entourage got drunk after making sacrifices to his father. Chage, the son of Abaoji's younger brother, Anduan, took advantage of the situation to kill Shizong. Chage was executed. Shizong died at the age of 33 and had not produced a son of age to inherit the throne. Shizong's rule was characterized by a series of rebellions from within his extended family. Although ruling for only four years, Shizong oversaw the formalization of the dual government system, which brought the structure of the Southern Establishment closer to the model used by the Tang dynasty.

Muzong (951–969)

Yelü Jing, posthumously Emperor Muzong of Liao, succeeded his cousin, Emperor Shizong of Liao. Muzong was a heavy drinker and spent most of his time either hunting or sleeping. The Chinese called him the "Sleeping Prince". The first half of his reign was marred by continued instability within his family. A younger brother of Shizong, Louguo, hatched a plot with one of his uncles to defect to Later Zhou. He was executed when the plot was discovered. In 953, a son of Yelü Lihu named Wan also conspired against the emperor. Wan was spared but his co-conspirators were executed. In 959, Dilie, one of Louguo's co-conspirators, plotted rebellion. The next year, Wan's older brother, Xiyin, was arrested for plotting rebellion. Lihu was implicated and died in prison.

During Muzong's reign, the Liao assisted Northern Han in fending off an attack by Later Zhou in 952. The Zhou attacked Han again in 954, and the Khitans once again came to their aid. The Khitans captured some Han troops by mistake and handed them back. On some occasions, Han envoys would visit the Liao to discuss strategic matters. Emperor Shizong of Later Zhou believed that the Liao dynasty were poised to invade the Zhou. In 958, the Han reported renewed attacks by the Zhou. In the following year, the Zhou invaded Liao territory, taking some border prefectures. Muzong headed south to confront the Zhou invasion but the Zhou emperor fell sick and had to return to Kaifeng. He died soon after and the Zhou invaders withdrew. In 960, the Zhou were replaced by the Song dynasty, which attacked Han in 963, and was repelled with the aid of the Khitans. Border skirmishes occurred between the Liao and Song in 963 and 967.

There were minor troubles with the Shiwei and Khongirad in 965, but otherwise the northern frontier remained calm for the Liao.

In 969, Muzong spent an entire month drinking and began to act violently and irrationally, butchering some of his bodyguards. On 12 March, six of his personal attendants murdered him. He was 37 years old. Muzong was the second and last Liao emperor to succeed Abaoji who was not a direct descendant of Yelü Bei.

Jingzong (969–982)

Yelü Xian, posthumously Emperor Jingzong of Liao, was the son of Emperor Shizong of Liao. During his reign, the Five Dynasties and Ten Kingdoms period came to an end with the rise of the Song dynasty, which replaced Later Zhou in 960. The Song had defeated all the competing states except for Northern Han by 978. Realizing their precarious situation, the Han strengthened their ties to the Liao with monthly courtesy missions starting in 971. In 974, the Song began negotiations with Liao for a possible neutrality treaty. The diplomatic efforts ended in failure and the Song invaded Han in 976 and 977, both times being repelled by Liao intervention. With the conquest of Wuyue in 978, the Song concentrated all their forces on an invasion of Han. This time they intercepted Liao forces en route to Han and crushed them. In the summer of 979, Emperor Taizong of Song took Taiyuan and annexed Northern Han. Taizong then made the disastrous mistake of attempting to invade Liao. His already overextended and tired troops advanced on the Supreme Capital. Initial skirmishes ended in the Song army's favor but they lost a crucial pitched battle on the Gaoliang River. Taizong was wounded and fled south in a donkey cart. Capitalizing on the Liao victory, Jingzong launched a punitive expedition in 980, and defeated a Song army. In another campaign in 982, the Liao army was defeated and Jingzong was forced to retreat.

Aside from conflict with the Song, the Liao also experienced trouble with the Tanguts in 973. In 975, conflict with remnants of the Balhae people led to an invasion of Jeongan, which failed. The Jurchens looted Liao territory in 973 and 976. In 981, captured Chinese soldiers attempted to enthrone a son of Xiyin but the plot failed, and Xiyin was forced to commit suicide.

In 977, an examination hall was established outside the Southern Capital.

On 13 October 982, Jingzong fell sick during a hunting trip and died in his camp. He was 34 years old. Before his death, he designated his eldest son, the 11 year old Longxu, as his successor.

Shengzong (982–1031)

Yelü Longxu, posthumously Emperor Shengzong of Liao, succeeded his father, Emperor Jingzong of Liao. He was only 11 years old at the time of his father's death so actual power fell to the regent, his mother Xiao Yanyan. Until her death in 1009, the Khitan empire was ruled by her and three ministers, two of whom were Chinese. Xiao Yanyan was an extremely capable ruler, being both astute in politics and warfare, commanding an ordo to herself capable of fielding 10,000 cavalry. According to the History of Liao, "most of his [Shengzong] success must be attributed to his mother's instruction."

Under Shengzong's reign, a number of administrative advances were produced. In 983, the Tang Code was ordered to be translated into Khitan for use by the Northern Administration and in 994, it was decided that any Khitan that transgressed the Ten Abominable Crimes would suffer the same punishment as a Chinese. In 1027, a revised Chinese style legal code was ordered. The first jinshi examination was held in 988, and they continued until the end of the dynasty. However, only two or three graduates out of ten were employed. The examinations focused on lyric-meter poetry and rhapsodies and only the Chinese took them. In 991, the first veritable records were produced, with those of Jingzong's reign taking up 20 chapters. In 994, the Khitans produced their own calendar. Rules on what matters should be recorded were made in 1011. In 991, the Khitans conducted their first general census and in 997 another census was taken for the tribal population.

The Kumo Xi were completely integrated into Khitan administration by 997. The prior arrangement of vassalage and tribute had lasted since the time of Emperor Taizong of Liao, but a series of reforms between 994 and 997 discontinued that role. The Kumo Xi king became a salaried official and Chinese style administrative units were set up in Kumo Xi territory. Their former capital became the "Central Capital" (Zhongjing), which received an inner and outer wall, a Confucian temple, and public buildings were constructed between 1018 and 1020.

Militarily, the Khitans came into conflict with both the Song dynasty and the Korean kingdom of Goryeo. In 986, Emperor Taizong of Song conducted a three-pronged invasion and quickly overwhelmed the Khitan border defenses, but the tide turned as they ventured deep into enemy territory. Far from their supply lines, the Song armies were surrounded and attacked from all sides, resulting in resounding victories for the Khitans on all three fronts. Despite their victory, the frontier was severely damaged and many people fled their homes. The region would not recover for years.

In 986, Li Jiqian of the Tanguts submitted to the Khitans and three later, was given a member of the Khitan imperial family as bride and installed as "King of Xia".

In 985–6, the Khitans attacked Jeongan. In 991, they established three fortified military colonies in the lower Yalu valley, and annexed Jeongan. Resistance from Jeongan ended in 999. In 992, the Khitans invaded Goryeo, sending a force supposedly 800,000 strong, and demanded that Goryeo cede territories along the Yalu River. Goryeo appealed for assistance from the Song dynasty, with whom they had a military alliance, but no Song assistance came. After the initial battles, the Khitans made steady southward progress before reaching the Cheongcheon River, at which point they called for negotiations with Goryeo military leadership. While the Khitans initially demanded total surrender from Goryeo, and Goryeo initially appeared willing to consider it, Seo Hui was eventually able to convince the Khitans to accept Goryeo as a tributary state instead. By 994, regular diplomatic exchanges between the Khitans and Goryeo began.

After securing the border with Goryeo, the Khitans attacked the Song dynasty in 994 and laid siege to Zitong, but was repelled by its defenders with fire arrows. The Khitans began a series of campaigns against the Song in 999. While generally successful on the battlefield, they failed to secure anything of value from the Song. This changed in 1004 when Shengzong and his mother led a lightning strike campaign right to the outskirts of the Song capital of Kaifeng by only taking cities that surrendered, while avoiding protracted sieges of the cities that resisted heavily. Emperor Zhenzong of Song marched out and met the Khitans at Chanyuan, a small city on the Yellow River. In January 1005, the two sides signed the Chanyuan Treaty, which stipulated that the Song would give the Liao 200,000 bolts of silk and 100,000 ounces of silver each year, that the two emperors would address each other as equals, that they would finalize the location of their disputed border, and that the two dynasties would resume cordial relations. While the sums (referred to as gifts by the Song and as tributes by the Liao) were later increased to 300,000 bolts of silk and 200,000 ounces of silver per year out of Song fears that the Khitans might form a military alliance with the Western Xia, no major wars were fought between the Khitans and the Song for over a century following the signing of the treaty. By signing the treaty, the Song functionally renounced its claim over the Sixteen Prefectures. Part of the border demarcated by the treaty was on the barrier-less North China Plain in Hebei. To fortify these most perilous borderlands, the Song created an extensive defensive forest along the Song-Liao border to thwart potential Khitan cavalry attacks.

Four years after the Song invasion, conflict with Goryeo erupted again. In 1009, the Goryeo general Gang Jo murdered Mokjong of Goryeo and put Hyeonjong of Goryeo on the throne with the intention of serving as the boy's regent. The Khitans immediately sent an army of 400,000 men to Goryeo to punish Gang Jo; however, after an initial period of military success and the breakdown of several attempts at peace negotiations, Goryeo and the Khitans entered a decade of continuous warfare. In 1018 the Khitans suffered a major defeat and their army was all but annihilated at the Battle of Gwiju by the Goryeo forces under General Gang Gam-chan. The next year, the Khitans assembled another large army to march on Goryeo. At this point both sides realized that they could not defeat each other militarily, so in 1020 King Hyeonjong resumed sending tribute, and in 1022 the Khitans officially recognized the legitimacy of King Hyeonjong's reign. Goryeo would remain a vassal, and the relationship between Liao and Goryeo would remain peaceful until the end of the Liao dynasty.

In 1006, the Kingdom of Guiyi sent tribute to Shengzong's court, which seems to have encouraged him to attack the Ganzhou Uyghur Kingdom. Expeditions against the Ganzhou Uyghurs were conducted in 1008, 1009, and 1010. These achieved limited success resulting in the deportation of some of the captured population. In 1027, the Khitans laid siege to Ganzhou but failed to take the city, and ended in disaster when they were ambushed by Zubu tribes.

In the 1020s, the Southern Establishment tried to extend its taxation system to the Balhae people of the defunct Dongdan Kingdom, who formerly only had to pay a tribute. The Balhae people were ordered to build boats to transport grain to the Southern Capital. The journey was dangerous and many boats were lost, leading to resentment. In the summer of 1029, a distant descendant of Balhae royalty, Da Yanlin, rebelled at the Eastern Capital. He imprisoned minister Xiao Xiaoxian and his wife, killed the tax commissioners and chief military commander, and declared his own Xing Liao dynasty. He requested aid from Goryeo but they refused to help. Other Balhae people serving in the military also refused to join him. Instead only a handful of Jurchens joined his regime. In 1030, Xingliao and its Jurchen and Goryeo allies were defeated by a Liao pincer attack led by Punu. A year later, one of Da Yanlin's officers betrayed him and opened the Eastern Capital's gates to the Khitans. His short lived dynasty came to an end. The old Balhae nobility were resettled near the Supreme Capital while others fled to Goryeo.

Shengzong died on 25 June 1031 at the age of 60. At his deathbed, he entrusted his ministers Xiao Xiaomu and Xiao Xiaoxian to enthrone his eldest son, the 15 year old Yelü Zongzhen.

Xingzong (1031–1055) 

The 15 year old Yelü Zongzhen, posthumously Emperor Xingzong of Liao, was born to Emperor Shengzong of Liao and one of his lesser consorts, Xiao Noujin. Despite his parentage, he was raised as the adopted son of Empress Qitian (Xiao Pusage). Noujin fabricated a plot by Qitian to rebel and had her banished and then forced to commit suicide. Noujin declared herself the regent, made her birthday a public holiday, and began holding court and conducting duties normally within the purview of the emperor. In 1034, Noujin plotted to replace Xingzong with his younger brother, Zhongyuan, whom she had brought up herself. Zhongyuan wanted no part of this and informed Xingzong of their mother's plans, resulting in Noujin's banishment to their father's mausoleum. For his part in defeating the coup, Zhongyuan was given the title of "Imperial Younger Brother" and filled a succession of high ranking posts: commander in chief, northern commissioner of military affairs, and viceroy of the Southern Capital. Noujin's relatives remained in power at court. In 1037, Xingzong attempted to reconcile with these elements by treating Noujin with great respect and paying her visits. Xingzong appointed her brother, Xiao Xiaomu, as northern chancellor. In 1039, Noujin returned to the capital and underwent a rebirth ceremony to symbolically re-establish her position. The Song dynasty began sending separate envoys to pay respects to her.

Xingzong's reign saw the codification of law in 1036 with the promulgation of the Xinding tiaozhi which contained 547 articles and compiled all the laws since Abaoji's reign. In 1046, all local administrators were ordered to report all legal cases to the Supreme Capital. The laws were further revised in 1051. The universal application of the law was opposed by the pro-Khitan faction of Zhongyuan. In 1043, Chinese living in the Southern Establishments were forbidden from owning bows and arrows. In 1044, at the suggestion of Zhongyuan, Khitan police inspectors were established in each of the capitals to protect Khitan interests. In 1046, Khitans were forbidden to sell slaves to Chinese. On the other hand, restrictions on the Balhae people relaxed and they were allowed to play polo, a game regarded as a military exercise.

Militarily, the Liao seemed to be in decline during Xingzong's reign. The number of wars conducted in previous decades had put a great burden on the people. In the late 1030s, Xingzong asked his ministers for advice on dealing with growing distress, impoverishment, internal discontent, and banditry due to excessive demands for corvée and military service. The Confucian scholar, Xiao Hanjianu, advocated for withdrawing overextended garrisons from far off frontiers and the cessation of expansionist policies that incorporated useless territory. Instead, these forces should be concentrated in key areas to the south and east. In 1039, a census was conducted to provide a basis for levying manpower. The army was short on horses so the sacrifice of horses and oxen in ceremonies was banned in 1043. The army and its dependencies were organized into registries in 1046 and these registries were further revised in 1051. There was also concern about the quality of the troops' training, especially the Chinese troops that specialized in artillery and crossbows, skills that augmented the Khitans' cavalry forces.

In 1042, the Khitans took advantage of the Li Yuanhao's invasion of Song to ask for territorial concessions from the Song. Negotiations resulted in the Liao dropping their territorial claims and an increase in annual tribute from the Song to 200,000 tales of silver and 300,000 bolts of silk. When Li Yuanhao asked the Khitans in 1043 to join him in attacking the Song, Xingzong refused. In 1044, some Tanguts living in Liao territory rebelled and sought refuge in Western Xia. The Khitans blamed Yuanhao for instigating the rebellion and immediately sent an invasion force led by Zhongyuan and the northern commissioner for military affairs Xiao Hui. Liao forces enjoyed an initial victory but failed to take the Xia capital and were brutally mauled by Yuanhao's defenders. According to Song spies, there was a succession of carts bearing Liao dead across the desert. In 1048, the Xia emperor died and the throne passed to an infant. The Khitans saw their opportunity for vengeance and invaded in a three pronged attack. The army under Xingzong's personal command encountered little resistance but had to withdraw owing to the lack of water and pasture for its horses. Xiao Hui's army advanced on the Yellow River with a flotilla of warships but was ambushed and defeated. The third army raided a Tangut palace in the Helan Mountains, capturing Yuanhao's young widow and some high-ranking officials. The Khitans invaded again the next year and plundered the Xia countryside and accepted the surrender of a Tangut general. The Western Xia agreed to become a tributary and peaceful relations were restored by 1053.

In 1044, Datong formally became the "Western Capital" (Xijing), completing the five capital regions.

Xingzong fell sick and died on 28 August 1055. He was 39 years old.

Daozong (1055–1101)

Yelü Hongji, posthumously Emperor Daozong of Liao, succeeded his father, Emperor Xingzong of Liao, having already gained experience in governing while his father was alive. Unlike his father, Daozong did not face a succession crisis. While both Xiao Noujin and Zhongyuan still held substantial power, neither disputed the succession.

Daozong's reign began with increased sinicization. In 1055 all officials, and not just the emperor and members of the Southern Establishment, were required to wear Chinese court dress at major ceremonies. Daozong himself was highly taken with Chinese learning, poetry, Confucianism, and Buddhism. He placed greater emphasis on Chinese education and the imperial examinations for selection of officials. The number of jinshi passed in each examination increased from 50 to 60 during Xingzong's reign to over 100 under Daozong. In 1059 prefectural and county schools were established, as well as institutions for higher learning in the capitals. In 1060, a second Guozijian was set up in the Central Capital in addition to the one in the Supreme Capital. In 1070 a special palace examination called the "Examination for the worthy and good" (Xianliang ge) was established, requiring entrants to submit 100,000 characters worth of writing. In 1072 Daozong personally wrote the questions for the palace examination.

In the early years, the court was dominated by two men, Xiao Ge and Xiao Ala. Xiao Ala was the son of Xiao Xiaomu and part of Xiao Noujin's extended family. He was a close friend of Xingzong and had served as state counselor and viceroy of the Eastern Capital. He was also married to an imperial princess. Upon Daozong's accession, Ala was made northern commissioner for military affairs, putting him alongside Xiao Ge as two of the most powerful men at court. The two had a falling out and Ala asked to retire. Instead he was sent to be viceroy of the Eastern Capital in 1059. In 1061 he returned to court and voiced harsh criticisms at the government. Ge denounced him to the emperor, and in spite of Empress Dowager Renyi's pleas, the emperor ordered Ala strangled. This left the court in the hands of Xiao Ge (who retired the next year), Yelü Renxian, and Yelü Yixin. Yixin grew up in poverty but rose to become a palace attendant under Xingzong and by the end of his reign, a guard commander. Under Daozong, Yixin was made southern chancellor and then transferred to the northern Chancellery in 1059. Renxian rose to prominence during negotiations with the Song dynasty in 1042. In 1060 Zhongyuan tried to have Renxian, who opposed his faction, removed from the southern Chancellery, but Yixin interceded on his behalf by going directly to Daozong.

In 1059 the tribal judges were ordered to refer all capital cases to the local prefect or magistrate for review. If anyone claimed that the sentence was unjust, it was to be referred to the central government for a decision. This possibly led to the rebellion of pro-Khitan elements under Zhongyuan in 1063. In 1061, Zhongyuan's son Nielugu was appointed southern commissioner for military affairs, and became a figurehead for dissident noblemen. Chief among the dissidents was Xiao Hudu, the northern commissioner for military affairs. In 1063, the dissidents ambushed Daozong while he was out on a hunting trip. Daozong was wounded when he had his horse shot out from under him by crossbowmen. He was saved by his servants while his mother, the Empress Dowager Renyi (Xiao Tali), led the guards to ward off the attackers. The battle lasted until dawn. Nielugu was killed by a stray arrow, Hudu fled and drowned himself, and Zhongyuan also fled and committed suicide. Yelü Ming, viceroy of the Southern Capital and a co-conspirator in the rebellion, did not give up when he heard of Zhongyuan's demise. He led a force of Kumo Xi into the capital and armed them with weapons to prepare for combat, but his deputy governor mobilized the Chinese garrison to resist them. When orders from the emperor arrived, Ming was executed. All the conspirators and their families, among them Xiao Ge, were executed, resulting in extensive changes in Liao leadership.

After the rebellion, Yelü Yixin and his ally Yelü Renxian jointly controlled the Northern Commission for Military Affairs for a while. In 1065, Renxian became commander in chief. For the next 15 years, Yixin exercised unrivaled influence in court and acted opportunistically to advance self-interest, selecting corrupt and worthless men for office, taking bribes, and allowing the military to do anything they wanted. Renxian tried to contain him but eventually left for the post of viceroy of the Southern Capital. Daozong remained aloof from politics, providing no real leadership, and instead opted to pursue his own scholarly interests. In 1064 he ordered a search for books lacking in the imperial collection. In 1074 the government distributed copies of the Records of the Grand Historian and the Book of Han. In the same year a bureau for compiling national history was established, which produced in 1085 Veritable Records for the first seven reigns. Daozong gathered prominent scholars around him to expound on various canonical texts and greatly patronized Buddhist monks. In 1090 a Song envoy commented on how lavishly the emperor patronized the Buddhist clergy and their all-pervasive influence on society. In the latter years of Daozong's reign, he all but abandoned his administrative duties. So ambivalent about administration was the emperor that he selected officials by having the candidates roll dice. This was how the historian who compiled the record of his reign was selected.

Khitan resistance to Han influence did not disappear after the rebellion. In 1064 the private publication of books was banned, a measure that would have only impacted the urban Han elite. In 1067 Daozong underwent a traditional rebirth ceremony, while still engrossed in his studies, to re-establish his legitimacy as leader of the Khitans. In 1070 the Han were forbidden from hunting, which was considered a military exercise. Daozong recognized that the Khitan and Han customs were different, so he ordered Yixin and Renxian to revise the universal laws to take this into account. The new laws, well over 1,000 articles and twice the size of the Xinding tiaozhi of 1036, receiving further amendments between 1075 and 1085, were so out of step with actual practice that they proved unenforceable. In 1089 the new laws were abandoned and the Xinding tiaozhi was reinstated. It is clear that while Daozong had a predilection towards Han culture, he also recognized that there were limits to how far he could advance pro-Han measures while governing Khitan elites. In 1074 the scholarly official Yelü Shuzhen suggested adopting Han style surnames for all Khitan tribes, which Daozong rejected, declaring that "the old order should not be changed suddenly".

Yelü Renxian, the only man whose influence rivaled Yelü Yixin, died in 1072. In 1075, Daozong's son and heir apparent, Prince Jun, who was both well educated and skilled as a horseman and archer, emerged as a potential threat to Yixin's influence over Daozong. To remove Jun, Yixin first set in motion plans to eliminate his mother, Xiao Guanyin. One of her household members accused her of having an affair with a palace musician, Zhao Weiyi. In addition, Yixin and his ally, the Han scholar Zhang Xiaojie, fabricated evidence that the empress had written erotic poems to Zhao. Believing Yixin's evidence, Daozong ordered Zhao and his clan executed and the empress, Xiao Guanyin, to commit suicide. Her body was returned to her family wrapped in a mat. Yelü Jun swore revenge for her mother's death and shortly after her suicide, Yixin survived an attempted assassination. Xiao Guanyin was replaced by the sister of one of Yixin's henchmen, Xiao Xiamo, whose other sister was married to Yixin's son. After the death of Empress Dowager Renyi in 1076, the new empress, Xiao Tansi, was installed. The next year, Yixin implicated a number of officials, all his enemies, with plotting a coup to replace Daozong with Jun. While the emperor was initially unmoved, Yixin fabricated a false confession by Jun, resulting in his demotion to commoner status and imprisonment. Yixin then sent emissaries to kill Jun and persuaded the viceroy of the Supreme Capital to report his death as a result of illness. Jun's wife was also killed when she was summoned to court by Daozong, who had almost immediately come to regret his actions.

The new empress remained barren so Daozong decided upon Jun's son, Yelü Yanxi, as heir. In 1079 when the emperor was about to leave on his winter hunting trip, Yelü Yixin tried to persuade him to leave his grandson behind. Various courtiers hostile to him immediately protested this and convinced Daozong to take his grandson with him. This incident seemed to finally awaken the emperor to Yixin's true nature. In 1080 Yixin was demoted and sent to Xingzhong. A year later he was found guilty of trading prohibited goods with a foreign state and sentenced to death. Zhang Xiaojie and the new empress were both exiled from the capital, although Zhang would later be allowed to return and died peacefully in the late 1080s. From then on, Yanxi was carefully groomed for the throne. In 1086 Daozong showed him the armour and weapons of Abaoji and Emperor Taizong of Liao, describing to him the hardships of the campaigns on which the dynasty was founded. A few weeks later Yanxi underwent a rebirth ceremony. In 1088 he was assigned to his first office. A year later he was married and sons were born in 1089 and 1093.

Economically the Liao dynasty suffered greatly from natural disasters during Daozong's reign. Starting from 1065, not a year went by without an area being struck by some natural disaster. At first it was mainly the southern agricultural regions that were effected but in the 1080s and 1090s, the tribal areas also seem to have experienced immense suffering, resulting in displaced families and vagrants. The government constantly lost revenue due to payments of relief and the granting of tax exemptions. In 1074, the Eastern Capital region was hit by severe flooding, after which orders were given to construct flood control works. This was opposed on grounds that the necessary labor levies involved would cause even greater hardship and unrest. In the winter of 1082–3, unusually heavy snowfall killed up to 60–70 percent of tribal livestock and horses.

Militarily the reign of Daozong saw little conflict with other settled states. In 1074 there was a border demarcation crisis with the Song but it was resolved by peaceful diplomacy in 1076. In 1078 Goryeo's king asked for territory east of the Yalu River, which was rejected without any trouble or break in relations. The situation on the northwestern borderland was less stable and events toward the end of Daozong's reign would see the subjugation of the Zubu tribes, some of whom lived in Liao territory but had long resisted Khitan rule. There were outbreaks of warfare with the Zubu previously in 997–1000, 1007, 1012–23, and 1027. In 1063, 1064, and 1070, prohibitions were placed on the trade of metals to the Western Xia, Zubu tribes, and Uyghurs. In 1069, there was a renewed Zubu rebellion which was put down by Yelü Renxian. In 1086 the Zubu chieftain attended court and Daozong ordered his grandson, Yelü Yanxi, to be friendly towards him as he was a valuable ally. However, in 1089, Zubu leadership passed to Mogusi. In 1092, the Khitans attacked several tribes in the northwest neighboring the Zubu and the Zubu became involved. In 1093 Mogusi led a series of raids deep into Liao territory and drove off many of the state herds of horses. Other tribes such as the Dilie (Tiriet), who had previously rebelled in 1073, also joined Mogusi. It took until 1100 for the northern commissioner for military affairs, Yelü Wotela, to capture and kill Mogusi. His death did not end warfare with the northwestern tribes and it took another two years to defeat the remaining Zubu forces. The war against the Zubu was the last successful military campaign waged by the Liao dynasty.

Daozong passed away on 12 February 1101 at the age of 68. He was succeeded by his grandson, Yelü Yanxi.

Tianzuo (1101–1125) 

The accession of Yelü Yanxi, posthumously Emperor Tianzuo of Liao, proceeded without incident. His first act upon becoming emperor was to desecrate the tomb of Yelü Yixin and all those who brought about the deaths of his grandmother and parents. The corpses of Yixin and his allies were mutilated. The deceased Emperor Daozong of Liao was interred together with the empress who had been forced to commit suicide. Tianzuo's father, Jun, was given a posthumous temple name as though he had reigned as emperor.

Natural disasters continued to plague the Liao dynasty intermittently. In 1105 Tianzuo went out in disguise to see the suffering of the people, but nothing else on record hints at what he may have prescribed in policy. In the same year, merchant families were barred from taking the jinshi exam, which suggests continued sinicization in the Liao mode of governance. Between 1103 and 1105, the Western Xia repeatedly requested the Khitans to attack the Song dynasty, but the Liao court refused. The Liao cemented its relations with the Tanguts with a marriage alliance and sent an envoy requesting the Song to stop its attacks on Western Xia. Diplomatic relations with the neighboring settled states remained cordial and even the Zubu sent embassies pledging their allegiance in 1106, 1110, and 1112.

Despite international peace on several fronts, the Liao dynasty would fall to the Jurchens by 1125. The Jurchens were a Tungusic people who lived in fragmented tribes stretching northward from the border of Goryeo. They had been in contact with the Khitans ever since Abaoji's rise to power. Despite their marginal status, they were militarily significant enough that the Song considered them a potential ally against the Liao, and periodically caused trouble for the Khitans. The Liao categorized the Jurchens into three groups: "civilized" Jurchens (shu nüzhi) descended from tribes captured by the Liao in the 10th century and assimilated into Khitan society, "obedient" Jurchens (shun nüzhi) subordinate to the Liao and had regular contact with the court, and "wild" Jurchens (sheng nüzhi) who inhabited the lower Songhua River valley and the eastern mountains of modern Heilongjiang. The wild Jurchens were nominally subordinate to the Liao but were functionally independent. During the 11th century, one of the wild Jurchen clans, the Wanyan, established dominance over their neighbors and created a semblance of Jurchen unity. The Liao court recognized this and conferred on their chieftains the title of military governor.

As the Wanyan clan consolidated their control over the Jurchens, relations with the Liao also became increasingly strained. The Jurchens resented the behavior of Liao officials at Ningjiang, the main border trading post, who constantly cheated them. The Liao also placed on them the obligation of supplying the Liao emperor with gyrfalcons called , only bred on the coastal regions and required the Jurchens to fight across the territory of their neighbors, the Five Nations, to access. Liao envoys also habitually beat their village elders and abused their women. One of the primary causes of the Jurchen rebellion was the custom of raping married Jurchen women and Jurchen girls by Khitan envoys, which caused resentment from the Jurchens. The custom of having sex with unmarried girls by Khitan was itself not a problem, since the practice of guest prostitution - giving female companions, food and shelter to guests – was common among Jurchens. Unmarried daughters of Jurchen families of lower and middle classes in Jurchen villages were provided to Khitan messengers for sex, as recorded by Hong Hao. Song envoys among the Jin were similarly entertained by singing girls in Guide, Henan. There is no evidence that guest prostitution of unmarried Jurchen girls to Khitan men was resented by the Jurchens. It was only when the Khitans forced aristocratic Jurchen families to give up their beautiful wives as guest prostitutes to Khitan messengers that the Jurchens became resentful. This suggests that in Jurchen upper classes, only a husband had the right to his married wife while among lower class Jurchens, the virginity of unmarried girls and sex with Khitan men did not impede their ability to marry later.

The Jurchen problem reared its head in late 1112 when Tianzuo embarked on a fishing expedition to the Huntong River (modern Songhua River), where the Jurchen tribes were expected to pay homage to the emperor. As a symbolic gesture of obeisance, the Jurchen chieftains were supposed to get up in turn and dance in the emperor's camp, but one of them, Aguda, refused. Even after being bidden three times, Aguda still refused to dance. Tianzuo wanted him executed for his act of defiance but the influential chancellor, Xiao Fengxian, dissuaded him from that course and belittled the harm Aguda could do. This would prove to be a fatal mistake as Aguda was elected ruler of the Jurchens in the following year. Aguda immediately began harassing the Liao for the return of Ashu, a Jurchen chieftain who opposed Wanyan hegemony and had taken refuge in Liao territory, and when his demands were refused, began building fortifications on the Liao border. In the late autumn of 1114 Aguda attacked Ningjiang. Underestimating the Jurchen threat, Tianzuo only sent some Balhae detachments from the Eastern Capital, which was utterly defeated. Another force composed of Khitan and Kumo Xi troops led by Xiao Sixian, the brother of Xiao Fengxian, was also defeated on the Songhua. Despite Sixian's incompetence, he escaped punishment, leading to demoralization of Khitan generals. By the end of the year, several border prefectures had been taken by the Jurchens and some neighboring tribes had also joined them.

In 1115 Tianzuo sent envoys to negotiate with the Jurchens, but Aguda had already declared himself emperor of the Jin dynasty, and rejected the Liao letters because they did not address him by his new title. Aguda continued to demand the return of Ashu and the withdraw of Liao troops from Huanglong, the major administrative center of the region. Huanglong fell to the Jin in late autumn. Tianzuo assembled a massive army west of the Songhua and crossed the river in the winter of 1115. His invasion was undermined by a plot to dethrone him and install his uncle, Prince Chun. The conspirators led by Yelü Zhangnu deserted the army and sent messengers informing Chun of their plan. Chun refused to take part in the coup and beheaded Zhangnu's messengers. The rebels then went about the countryside creating havoc until they were defeated by a small group of loyal Jurchens. Zhangnu was caught trying to escape to the Jin disguised as a messenger and was executed by being cut in half at the waist. More than 200 implicated nobles were executed and their families condemned to slavery. In early 1116 another rebellion occurred at the Eastern Capital when a Balhae officer named Gao Yongchang declared himself emperor of the Yuan dynasty and requested aid from the Jin. The Jin relief troops to Yuan easily repulsed the Liao troops but then turned on the Balhae rebels and killed Gao Yongchang. With the destruction of the Yuan dynasty, the entire region east of the Liao River fell to the Jin. To ensure Chun's continued loyalty, he was made commander in chief of the Liao armies and entrusted with defense operations against the Jin. Chun proved to be an awful commander. His new army, composed of Balhae refugees, inflicted more damage on the civilian population than the enemies. When the Jin attacked Chunzhou on the Songhua in early 1117, the Liao army melted away, not even offering a token resistance. At the end of the year, the Jin forces crossed the Liao River, defeated Chun's army, and conquered several prefectures.

After the Jin's initial conquests, a lull in military activity followed. In 1118 Tianzuo initiated peace negotiations, but the Jin demands were so onerous, requesting half of the Liao empire in addition to payments of silk and silver, that they were impossible to meet. Aguda was unable to immediately continue military campaigns against the Liao due to stretched resources. In 1119 a rebellion against the Jin occurred at the Eastern Capital and had to be suppressed. This brief interlude was no less kind to the Liao, which was plagued by famine, local rebellions, and defections to the Jin. Hostilities renewed in the spring of 1020 when Aguda broke off negotiations.

The Jin captured the Supreme Capital in mid-1120 and stopped its advance to escape the summer heat. In the spring of 1121, Tianzuo's second wife, Lady Wen, conspired with her brother in law, General Yelü Yudu, to depose the emperor and enthrone her son. The plot was uncovered by Xiao Fengxian, whose sister, Lady Yuan, also hoped to have her son succeed. Lady Wen was forced to commit suicide but Yudu escaped and defected to the Jin. He was allowed to remain in command of his troops and in the winter of 1121–2, he led Jin forces to capture the Central Capital. Leaving Prince Chun in charge of the Southern Capital, Tianzuo embarked on a prolonged flight from the Jin, passing through Juyong Pass to the Western Capital. Shortly afterward, Tianzuo grew tired of Xiao Fengxian's manipulations, which had caused the death of his son, and had him commit suicide. Tianzuo then fled to the Yin Mountains where he tried to recruit fresh troops from local tribes. Following his trail, the Jin took the Western Capital in the spring of 1122. The Tanguts, fearing an invasion of their border, sent troops in support of Tianzuo and blocked the Jurchen advance. Soon after Aguda arrived, he defeated a Khitan-Tangut force near the Xia border, and turned back east to take the Southern Capital, where Prince Chun had been declared the new Liao emperor (Northern Liao).

Only three months after becoming emperor, Chun died, leaving his widowed empress in charge. In the late autumn of 1122, her commanders Guo Yaoshi and Gao Feng defected with their troops to the Song. They led Song troops in an attack on the Southern Capital, but even in the Liao's withered state, the Song army was still unable to overcome Khitan defenses and failed to take the city. In the winter, Aguda took the Southern Capital, and the remaining Khitans fled in two groups to the west. One group led by Xiao Gan fled to Western Xia where they set up a short lived Xi dynasty that lasted only five months before Gan died at the hands of his own troops. The other group, led by Yelü Dashi, joined Tianzuo at the Xia border. In the early summer of 1123, Dashi was captured by the Jin and forced to lead them to Tianzuo's camp, where the entire imperial family except for Tianzuo and one son were captured. Tianzuo sought refuge with Emperor Chongzong of Western Xia, who while initially receptive, changed his mind after warnings from the Jurchens and declared himself a vassal of Jin in 1124. Tianzuo fled further north into the steppes where he traded his clothes for food from the Khongirad. In spite of all these setbacks, Tianzuo still held onto the delusion of retaking the Western and Southern Capitals, and attacked nearby prefectures. Dashi, who had rejoined Tianzuo, grew tired of his behavior and left for the west. Tianzuo was captured in early 1125 and taken to the Jin court where he held the title of "king of the seashore". According to the History of Liao, Tianzuo died at the age of 54 in 1128.

Qara Khitai

Yelü Dashi fled northwest and established his headquarter at the military garrison of Kedun (Zhenzhou) on the Orkhon River. Dashi secured the allegiance of the garrison forces numbering 20,000 and set himself as gurkhan (universal khan). In 1130, Dashi led his host further west in search of new territory. Within a year, he had established himself as suzerain of Qocho and gained a foothold in Transoxiana. After conquering the Karakhanid city of Balasaghun (in modern Kyrgyzstan), he attempted to reclaim former Liao territory, which ended in disaster. Failing in that endeavor, Dashi established a permanent Khitan state in Central Asia known as the Qara Khitai or the Western Liao dynasty. The new Liao empire expanded to the Aral Sea, defeating the Kara-Khanid Khanate and Seljuk Empire at the Battle of Qatwan in 1141, and establishing their dominance in the region. With several key trading cities, the Qara Khitai was a multicultural state that showed evidence of religious tolerance. "Qara," which means black, corresponds to the Liao's dynastic color black and its dynastic element water.

Yelü Dashi's dynasty was usurped by the Naimans under Kuchlug in 1211 and traditional Chinese, Persian, and Arab sources consider the usurpation to be the end of the dynasty. The empire ended with the Mongol conquest in 1218.

The Jurchen Jin dynasty was conquered by the Mongol Empire in 1234.

Government 

At its height, the Liao dynasty controlled what is now Shanxi, Hebei, Liaoning, Jilin, Heilongjiang, and Inner Mongolia provinces in China, as well as northern portions of the Korean peninsula, portions of the Russian Far East, and much of the country of Mongolia. The peak population is estimated at 750,000 Khitans and two to three million ethnic Han Chinese.

Enthronement ceremonies
There were two ceremonies for the ascension of Khitan leaders, the Chaice Yi (Recognition Ceremony) and Zaisheng Yi (Rebirth Ceremony). These ceremonies were created during the reign of Zuwu khagan (r. 735–745) when leaders were elected. The Liao dynasty inherited these ceremonies as symbolic rituals for the enthronement of the emperor. The Rebirth Ceremony was then performed every 12 years by the emperor and confirmed his right to rule.

Law and administration 

The Liao employed two separate governments operating in parallel with one another: a Northern Administration in charge of Khitan and other nomadic peoples, most of whom lived in the northern side of Liao territory, and a Southern Administration in charge of the Chinese populace that lived predominantly in the southern side. When Abaoji first established the system, these two governments did not have strict territorial boundaries, but Emperor Shizong established formally delineated boundaries for the two administrations early in his reign. The newly delineated Northern Administration had large Han Chinese, Balhae, and Uighur populations, and was given its own set of parallel northern and southern governments.

The governments of the Northern Administration and the Southern Administration operated very differently. The Northern Administration operated under a system which Twitchett and Tietze called "essentially a great tribal leader's personal retinue". Many of the governmental appointments dealt with tribal affairs, herds, and retainers serving the imperial house, and most powerful and high-ranking positions dealt with military affairs. The overwhelming majority of officeholders were Khitans, mainly from the imperial Yelü clan and the Xiao consort clan. The Southern Administration was more heavily structured, with Twitchett and Tietze calling it "designed in imitation of a T'ang model". Unlike the Northern Administration, many of the low- and medium-ranked officials in the Southern Administration were Han Chinese.

The Liao dynasty was further divided into five "circuits", each with a capital city. The general idea for this system was taken from the Balhae, although no captured Balhae cities were made into circuit capitals. The five capital cities were Shangjing (上京), meaning Supreme Capital, located in modern-day Inner Mongolia; Nanjing (南京), meaning Southern Capital, located near modern-day Beijing; Dongjing (東京), meaning Eastern Capital, located near modern-day Liaoning; Zhongjing (中京), meaning Central Capital, located in modern-day Hebei province near the Laoha river; and Xijing (西京), meaning Western Capital, located near modern-day Datong. Each circuit was headed by a powerful viceroy who had the autonomy to tailor policies to meet the needs of the population within his circuit. Circuits were further subdivided into administrations called fu (府), which were metropolitan areas surrounding capital cities, and outside of metropolitan areas were divided into prefectures called zhou (州), which themselves were divided into counties called xian (縣).

Despite these administrative systems, important state decisions were still made by the emperor. The emperor met with officials from the Northern and Southern Administrations twice a year, but aside from that the emperor spent much of his time attending to tribal affairs outside of the capital cities.

Military

The Liao army was originally just 2,000 men picked from various tribes as Abaoji's personal retinue. To these 2,000 men were added captives taken from Balhae and the prefecture of Jingzhou. By the time it became an orda, the emperor's private army, it contained 15,000 households, and could field up to 6,000 horsemen. The Liao nobles each had their own orda which the Liao government "borrowed" for campaign. According to the History of Liao, the Liao nobles treated the state as if it was their family. They provided private armies to assist the government during times of war. The larger ordas comprised up to a thousand or more horsemen while smaller ones several hundred horsemen. By the end of the dynasty, the ordas together constituted 81,000 Khitan households and 124,000 Balhae and Chinese households, which together could field up to 101,000 horsemen.

The Liao Army was composed of 3 sections: the Ordu, who were the elite personal cavalry of the Emperor, the tribal cavalry of Khitans and an auxiliary force of non-Khitan tribes, and militia infantry of Han Chinese and other sedentary peoples, who also provided the foot archers and catapult crews. Appanage territories were often granted to commanders. The core of the Liao army was composed of heavy armoured cavalry. In battle they arrayed light cavalry in the front and two layers of armoured cavalry in the back. Even foragers were armoured. Units of Khitan heavy cavalry were organized in groups of 500 to 700 men. Unlike some other empires originating from nomadic tribes, the Khitans preferred to fight in dense heavy cavalry formations rather than the wide formations of horse archers.

Society and culture

Language

The Khitan language is closely related to the Mongolic language family; some broader definitions of the Mongolic family include Khitan as a member. It is distantly related to the Mongolian language with many loan words from Tungusic languages and Turkic languages.

Prior to their conquest of north China and the establishment of the Liao dynasty, the Khitans had no written language. In 920 the first of two Khitan scripts, the Khitan large script, was developed. A second script, the Khitan small script, was developed in 925. Both scripts are based on the same spoken language, and both contain a mix of logographs and phonographs. Despite surface level similarities to Chinese characters, the Khitan scripts are functionally unintelligible to Chinese readers, and neither scripts have been fully deciphered to this day.

Only a single manuscript text in the Khitan large script is known (Nova N 176), and no manuscripts in the Khitan small script are known. Most surviving specimens of both Khitan scripts are epitaph inscriptions on stone tablets, as well as a number of inscriptions on coins, mirrors and seals. The Liao emperors could read Chinese, and while there were some Chinese works translated into Khitan during the Liao dynasty, the Confucian classics, which served as the core guide to the administration of government in China, are not known to have been translated into Khitan.

Status of women 

The status of women in the Liao dynasty varied greatly, with the Khitan Liao (like many other nomadic societies) having a much more egalitarian view towards women than the Han Chinese did. Khitan women were taught how to hunt, and managed family herds, flocks, finances, and property when their husbands were at war. Upper-class women were able to hold governmental and military posts. Han Chinese living under the Liao dynasty were not forced to adopt Khitan practices, and while some Han Chinese did, many did not.

Marriage practices 
Women among the Khitan elite had arranged marriages, in some cases for political purposes. Men from the elite classes tended to marry women from the generation their senior. While this did not necessarily mean that there would be a large gap in ages between husband and wife, it was often the case. Among the ruling Yelü clan, the average age that boys married was sixteen, while the average age that girls married was between sixteen and twenty-two. Although rare, ages as young as twelve were recorded, for both boys and girls. A special variety of polygamy known as sororate, in which a man would marry two or more women who were sisters, was practiced among the Liao elite. Polygamy was not restricted only to sororate, with some men having three or more wives, only some of whom were sisters. Sororate continued throughout the length of the Liao dynasty, despite laws banning the practice. Over the course of the dynasty, the Khitan elite moved away from having several wives and towards the Han Chinese system of having one wife and one or more concubines. This was done largely to smooth over the process of inheritance.

Lower class Khitan women in the Liao dynasty did not have arranged marriages and would attract suitors by singing and dancing in the streets. The songs served as self-advertisements, with the women telling of their beauty, familial status, and domestic skills. Virginity was not a requirement for marriage among the Khitans. Betrothal was seen in Khitan society as being equally serious to, if not more serious than, marriage itself, and was difficult to annul. The groom would pledge to work for three years for the bride's family, pay a bride price, and lavish the bride's family with gifts. After the three years, the groom would be allowed to take the bride back to his home, and the bride would usually cut off all ties with her family. Abduction of marriage-age women was common during the Liao dynasty. Khitan men of all social classes participated in the activity, and the abductees included both Khitan and Han Chinese. In some cases, this was a step in the courtship process, where the woman would agree to the abduction and the resulting sexual intercourse, and then the abductor and abductee would return to the woman's home to announce their intention to marry. This process was known as baimen (拜門). In other cases, the abduction would be non-consensual and would result in a rape. Khitan women had the right to divorce their husbands and were able to remarry after being divorced.

Religion 

Religion in Liao society was a synthesis of Buddhism, Confucianism, Daoism, and Khitan tribal religion. During Abaoji's reign, temples of all three major religions were constructed, but afterwards, imperial patronage was restricted mainly to Buddhism, which by the early tenth century, the majority of Khitans had adopted. The Buddha was considered a protective deity by the Khitans, who named him "The Benevolent King Who Guards the Country." They invoked Buddhism whenever they went to war and made massive offerings to placate the souls of fallen soldiers. The Liao began printing Buddhist texts in the 990s and an entire copy of the Tripitaka was completed in 1075. Portions of it have been found in a pagoda built in 1056. Buddhist scholars living during the time of the Liao dynasty predicted that the mofa (末法), an age in which the three treasures of Buddhism would be destroyed, was to begin in the year 1052. Previous dynasties, including the Sui and Tang, were also concerned with the mofa, although their predictions for when the mofa would start were different from the one selected by the Liao. As early as the Sui dynasty, efforts were made to preserve Buddhist teachings by carving them into stone or burying them. These efforts continued into the Liao dynasty, with Emperor Xingzong funding several projects in the years immediately preceding 1052.

Some elements of traditional Khitan tribal religion continued to be observed. The Khitans worshiped the sun and the ritual position for the emperor was to face the east where the sun rose, unlike Han Chinese emperors, who faced south. Royal dwellings also faced the east. Khitans worshiped spirits of the Muye Mountain, the legendary home of the Khitans' ancestors, and a "Black Mountain." When a Khitan nobleman died, burnt offerings were sacrificed at the full and new moons. The body was exposed for three years in the mountains, after which the bones would be cremated. The Khitan believed that the souls of the dead rested at the Black Mountain, near Rehe Province. Liao burial sites indicate that animistic or shamanistic practices coexisted with Buddhism in marriage and burial ceremonies. Both animal and human sacrifices have been found in Liao tombs alongside indications of Buddhist influence. Khitan hunters offered a sacrifice to the spirit of the animal they were hunting and wore a pelt from the same animal during the hunt. There were festivals to mark the catching of the first fish and wild goose, and annual sacrifices of animals to the sky, earth, ancestors, mountains, rivers, and others. Every male Khitan would sacrifice a white horse, white sheep, and white goose during the Winter solstice. In warfare, they practiced a form of divination where the decision to carry out war was determined by whether or not the shoulder blade of a white sheep cracked while being heated (scapulimancy).

During the reign of the Liao dynasty the Niujie Mosque was designed by Nazaruddin, the son of a local Imam.

Burial

The Khitans buried their elite dead with metal masks and woven-wire suits. The masks were personalized to the face of the deceased and made from bronze, silver, or gold depending on their status. The Princess of Chen and her husband were found in a silver wire-suit with gold masks and a gold headdress. Sometimes earrings are depicted on the masks as well. The Khitans believed a metal mask and suit would preserve the body and prevent decay. Some remains were cremated.

Cultural legacy 

The influence of the Liao dynasty on subsequent culture includes a large legacy of statuary art works, with important surviving examples in painted wood, metal, and three-color glazed sancai ceramics. The music and songs of the Liao dynasty are also known to have indirectly or directly influenced Mongol, Jurchen, and Chinese musical traditions.

The rhythmic and tonal pattern of the ci (詞) form of poetry, an important part of Song dynasty poetry, uses a set of poetic meters and is based upon certain definitive musical song tunes. The specific origin of these various original tunes and musical modes is not known, but the influence of Liao dynasty lyrics both directly and indirectly through the music and lyrics of the Jurchen Jin dynasty appears likely. At least one Han Chinese source considered the Liao (and Jurchen) music to be the vigorous and powerful music of horse-mounted warriors, diffused through border warfare.

Another influence of the Liao cultural tradition is seen in the Yuan dynasty's zaju (雜劇) theater, its associated orchestration, and the qu (曲) and sanqu (散曲) forms of Classical Chinese poetry. One documented way in which this influence occurred was through the incorporation of Khitan officers and men into the service of the Mongol forces during the first Mongol invasion of 1211 to 1215. This northern route of cultural transmission of the legacy of Liao culture was then returned to China during the Yuan dynasty.

Historic site 

The Chinese state news agency Xinhua announced in January 2018 that the ruins in Duolun County, Inner Mongolia, of an ancient palace that served as the summer retreat for the royal family and retinue of the Liao dynasty, had been discovered. They would move each year from mid-April to mid-July to avoid the heat. The site includes foundations of 12 buildings of more than 2,500 square feet that have been recorded and artifacts, such as glazed tiles, pottery and copper nails that were used to date the site.

See also 

 Eastern Liao
 Emperors family tree
 Fashion in the Liao dynasty
 Later Liao
 List of emperors of the Liao dynasty
 Northern Liao
 Western Liao

References

Citations

Sources 

 
 
 
 Chen Yuan (2014), "Legitimation Discourse and the Theory of the Five Elements in Imperial China," Journal of Song-Yuan Studies 44: 325–364. DOI: 10.1353/sys.2014.0000.
 
 
 
 

 
 
 
 
 
 
 
 
 
 
 
 
 
 
 
 

*

External links 

 "Gilded Splendor" - Liao dynasty art at Asiasociety.org

 
Dynasties in Chinese history
Former countries in Chinese history
History of Mongolia
History of Manchuria
Khitan history
Khanates
Medieval Asia
Nomadic groups in Eurasia
10th century in China
.
.
10th century in Mongolia
10th century in Russia
11th century in Mongolia
11th century in Russia
States and territories established in the 900s
States and territories disestablished in 1125
907 establishments
1125 disestablishments in Asia
10th-century establishments in China
12th-century disestablishments in China
Former empires